Kishoreganj-3 is a constituency represented in the Jatiya Sangsad (National Parliament) of Bangladesh from 2008 by Mujibul Haque of the Jatiya Party.

Boundaries 
The constituency encompasses Tarail, and Karimganj upazilas.

Members of Parliament

References

External links
 

Parliamentary constituencies in Bangladesh